Shadowland is a horror/fantasy novel by American writer Peter Straub, first published in 1980 by Coward, McCann & Geoghegan.  It is a horror novel that has strong elements of fantasy and magic. The book chronicles the tale of two teenage boys and their adventure in the mysterious and dangerous Shadowland where reality and illusions are intertwined. It was the first book Straub wrote following his highly successful Ghost Story.

Plot Summary

The story concerns two teenage boys, Tom Flanagan, and Del Nightingale, who attend a prestigious all boys private school called Carson's.  The freshmen students are at the whims of the seniors, most notably, Steve “Skeleton” Ridpath, son of Coach Ridpath, one of many mean and troublesome teachers at Carson. Tom befriends several of the freshmen and bonds with them over the school year. Tom and Skeleton are haunted by ghostly visions of vultures and of a nightmarish figure that Del seems to know. Skeleton becomes insane and sociopathic over the course of the novel and behaves strangely during school because of these occurrences. Del and Tom bond over their shared love of magic, which Del is an expert at and demonstrates to Tom during their school year.

During an away football game at another private school, the boys see Skeleton nonchalantly steal an  artifact from the other school. This causes disarray from both schools and Carson students are subjected to extensive interrogation from the teachers, and they can't figure out who stole the item. It is revealed that Skeleton kept the item, a bejeweled owl, alongside papers he cheated off of inside the piano, which explained as to why he got so angry at the students when they were near it, exampled when Skeleton whipped Del with his belt. Del breaks the owl thereafter, and the situation is mostly forgotten.

Tom and Del are allowed to create a magic club at school and perform a magic show. Suddenly the auditorium catches fire at the end of Tom and Del's act. The faculty barely escape but do so, and there is only one casualty, fellow freshmen and math whiz, Dave Brick. Tom and Del are stumped as to who caused the fire and wonder where Skeleton was. Summer arrives and Del asks Tom to go with him to Shadowland. Tom goes since his father is dead and feels a need to protect him. Together they board a train from Arizona to Vermont to stay at Del's uncles home. Del revealed to Tom that his uncle was a renowned magician and taught real magic to Del and he wishes to teach Tom as well. He also reveals that he controlled Skeleton to steal the owl, hoping to have Skeleton suspended from school, although the plan evidently did not work.

During the train ride, Tom is frightened when Skeleton boards the train and stumbles upon a late forties compartment at the back of the train that wasn't there before. Skeleton is nowhere to be found and the train is delayed after a crash a few miles ahead. Tom meets Del's uncle, alcoholic magician Coleman Collins. They travel to Collins's estate, what he calls Shadowland, and prepares to teach them magic over the summer. Tom and Del are subjected to countless hallucinations and tricks by Collins to teach them magic. Collins tells stories to both boys in the woods, recounting his time as a medic during WWII, and the origin of his magical persona. Del gets jealous that Tom is spending more time with Collins, who admits to Tom that he wants him to take his position as King of the Cats and ruler of Shadowland, and Tom pretends to think it over, secretly wanting to hand the position to Del. The boys become distant but slowly reconcile over time.

At Shadowland are a group of muscular men called the Wandering Boys who enjoy badger baiting and stay in the woods at the Shadowland estate, and act as Collins bodyguards and were part of his traveling act during the War. Del introduces Tom to Rose Armstrong, a fifteen year old girl who stays on the estate near the lake. Both boys fall in love with her, and Rose falls in love with Tom, and tells him that she wishes to escape Shadowland before the “big show.” They persuade Del to accompany them, and Del slowly sees that Collins is a madman and is psychotic. Over the course of the novel Tom and Rose meet at night, thinking of ways to escape Shadowland and getting closer with each other.

Collins becomes more mysterious and dangerous as he tells the children the tale of the Collector, a creature he had created during his magic shows, which was accompanied by his friends Rosa Forte (a singer and reincarnation of Rose) and Speckle John (another magician who taught Collins magic). The Collector was a receptacle and he was used by Collins on people that got in his way. The Collector was created during Collins time as a medic during the war when he developed multiple personality disorder after mercy-killing another soldier and the stress made Collins run away to do magic shows around Europe. Tom starts to grow worried that Collins will force him to become the leader of Shadowland and train him to be the greatest magician and Collins reveals that he had taken Speckle John's magic after becoming a better magician than his mentor and left him alive, believing it was a fate worse than death.

Rose, Tom and Del escape Shadowland through underground tunnels. Tom is greeted by a demon called M. who attempts to coerce Tom to leave his friends and join Collins as a magician. He declines. The three continue through the tunnels, and are caught by the Wandering Boys. Rose reveals to have betrayed them, having led them down the tunnel they had previously journeyed, believing it was the best solution to escape. Collins decides to start his final performance early and has the Wandering Boys crucify Tom in the theater, where Collins also taught the boys magic and told stories. The other Boys go outside and start beating Del to death.

When Tom awakens, he is able to free himself from the cross with the help of Del's butler (who is a reincarnation of Speckle John) who mentally pushes him. In pain, Tom manages to go outside and using an old revolver, shoots and kills a few of the Wandering Boys before the others scramble. Tom comforts a bruised and dying Del. Rose joins them, revealing she did not know that Collins planned on killing the two. Tom sees she was also tricked by Collins. The boys witness Collins as the Collector arrives, in the form of Skeleton Ridpath, who was revealed to have been possessed near the beginning of the novel by the Collector. Tom is momentarily killed by the Collector, who transports him, Del and Rose to the theater. Tom is revived and Del is then taken to Collins, who blows up the last Wandering Boy, killing him.

Rose runs from the theater as Tom fights off the Collector. Tom manages to save Skeleton and rips him from the shell of the Collectors skin. Skeleton then runs away from Shadowland. Tom and Rose then barge into Collins's room, and he forces Tom to drop his gun, or else he'll kill Del. Collins then tells Tom he has one more performance left, transforms Del into a bird and escapes. Tom follows Collins after-images around the house. At the theater, numerous people watch in the audience as Collins transforms the bird version of Del into a statue, killing the boy. Tom and Collins fight just like Tom fought the Collector. Tom forces Collins into the Collector and sends him away through the bathroom mirror where the Collector resides. Tom then sets fire to the house and leaves through the tunnels. Tom takes the Book of Spells (which Collins used in his early career with Speckle John) with him before going. Rose takes Tom to the beach and in the morning disappears. Tom sets the statued Del on the lake before leaving the ruined Shadowland.

It is also revealed at the beginning and throughout the novel that one of Tom's friends from school had written the story with Tom's permission and had been going around and asking others who knew Tom to gather research on the story. The friend visits an older Skeleton, who is now a priest, and then visits the ruins of Shadowland where he comes to terms that Tom was telling the truth.

Setting 
Parts of the novel involves a thinly disguised version of Milwaukee Country Day School, which Straub attended. The school, Carson, resides in Arizona.

The second location, known as “Shadowland” resides in Vermont. It features Coleman Collins large, Victorian mansion, hiding various rooms inside. The home is surrounded by a vast forest. Near the middle of Shadowland is a lake with several boathouses on the shores. A small fictional town, Hilly Vale exists near Shadowland and several underground tunnels run through the lands. The place burned down after Tom Flanagan killed Collins and escaped.

References

1980 American novels
1980s horror novels
Coward-McCann books
Novels about magic
Novels by Peter Straub